Alexander Chadbourne Eschweiler (August 10, 1865 – June 12, 1940) was an American architect with a practice in Milwaukee, Wisconsin. He designed both residences and commercial structures. His eye-catching Japonist pagoda design for filling stations for Wadham's Oil and Grease Company of Milwaukee were repeated over a hundred times, though only a very few survive. His substantial turn-of-the-20th-century residences for the Milwaukee business elite, in conservative  Jacobethan or neo-Georgian idioms, have preserved their cachet in the city.

Early life 
Eschweiler was born in Boston, Massachusetts. He studied at Marquette University and Cornell University, graduating in 1890. Eschweiler opened his practice in Milwaukee in 1892. In 1923 his sons, Alexander C. Eschweiler Jr.,  Theodore, and Carl joined him in practice.

Career 
A number of Eschweiler works are listed on the National Register of Historic Places.

Eighty-one surviving commissions were listed in the exhibition "Alexander Eschweiler in Milwaukee: Celebrating a Rich Architectural Heritage" at the Charles Allis Art Museum in 2007.

Personal life

Summer home 
The Eschweilers had a second home on North Lake in the village of Chenequa, Wisconsin He did not design the residence. It was originally a 100-acre parcel he had purchased in the early 1900s, which included a small cottage from the 1870s. It was eventually torn down and the land was subdivided to settle the estate. The property was split into a 2.8-acre parcel and an 8.3-acre parcel, but six of the acres in the larger parcel are along the lake and are placed in a conservation easement that prohibits development.

Eschweiler was instrumental in the incorporation of the village of Chenequa. He was one of a handful of notable residents that testified in court that it was his residence.

Death 
He is buried at St. Peter's Episcopal Church, North Lake, next to his wife and daughter. His plot is near St. Teresa of Calcutta Church, "so he could overlook his 'masterpiece.'"

Legacy 
The Eschweiler Prize, made from a bequest of Alexander C. Eschweiler, Jr., in memory of his father Alexander C. Eschweiler, is an annual award of approximately $3,000 given to a student in architecture at Cornell. Eschweiler's son Carl's diploma hangs in the front office of Stone Bank School, where Alexander's children attended.

Selected works

Works include (with attribution):
(by year)
Edward Cowdery House, 2743 N. Lake Drive, Milwaukee, 1896.
Milwaukee Gas Light Company, West Side works.
John Murphy House, 2030 E. Lafayette Place, Milwaukee, 1899. A compromise with Prairie School architecture.
Robert Nunnemacher house, 2409 N. Wahl Avenue, Milwaukee, 1906. Symmetrical Jacobethan style, brick with stone quoins.
Charles Allis House, 1801 N. Prospect Avenue, Milwaukee, 1909, in a Jacobethan style. Now open as the Charles Allis Art Museum.
James K. Ilsley House, Milwaukee.
Elizabeth Black residence.
1919, St. John Church in Monches and St. Clare in North Lake, which together make up Blessed Teresa of Calcutta
Thomas A. Greene Memorial Museum, Milwaukee.
Milwaukee-Downer "Quad", now University of Wisconsin at Milwaukee, NW corner of Hartford and Downer Aves. Milwaukee, WI (Eschweiler, Alexander C.), NRHP-listed
John Mariner Building (Hotel Metro), Milwaukee, 1937. Art Moderne in style, with curved wrap-around corners; the first commercial structure in Milwaukee to feature air conditioning.
Wisconsin Gas Building, Milwaukee.
Wisconsin Telephone Building, 722 N. Broadway. Ground floor remodeled for AT&T.
Milwaukee Arena.
C. B. Bird House, 522 McIndoe St. Wausau, 1910, (Eschweiler, Alexander C.), NRHP-listed
Chi Psi Lodge at the University of Wisconsin-Madison, 150 Iota Court, Madison, 1913 (Eschweiler, Alexander C.), Madison Historic Landmarks
First Universalist Church, 504 Grant St. Wausau, 1914, (Eschweiler, Alexander C.), NRHP-listed
Marathon County Fairgrounds stock judging pavilion, Wausau, 1921
E.K. Schuetz House, 930 Franklin St. Wausau, 1922, Wausau, WI (Eschweiler, Alexander C.), NRHP-listed
D. C. Everest House, 1206 Highland Park Blvd. Wausau, 1925, (Eschweiler & Eschweiler), NRHP-listed
C. F. Dunbar House, 929 McIndoe St. Wausau, 1926 (Eschweiler & Eschweiler), NRHP-listed
St. Peter's Episcopal Church, 302 Merchants Ave. Fort Atkinson, 1928 (Eschweiler & Eschweiler)
Horace A.J. Upham House, W9888 Hwy 13, Wisconsin Dells, WI, 1899. (Pictures:1, 2, 3, 4,5, 6, 7, 8, 9, 10, 11 & 12) (Wis Arch Inventory #6072)

(Others, alphabetically)
Charles Allis House, 1630 E. Royall Pl. Milwaukee, WI (Eschweiler, Alexander C.), NRHP-listed
Bank of Hartland, 112 E. Capitol Dr. Hartland, WI (Eschweiler & Eschweiler), NRHP-listed
Edward D. & Vina Shattuck Beals House, 220 N. Park Ave. Neenah, WI (Eschweiler, Alexander C.), NRHP-listed
Joseph Dessert Library, 123 Main St. Mosinee, WI (Eschweiler, Alexander C.), NRHP-listed
One or more works in East Hill Residential Historic District, roughly bounded by North Seventh, Adams, North Tenth, Scott and North Bellis Sts. Wausau, WI (Eschweiler, Alexander), NRHP-listed
Thomas A. Greene Memorial Museum, 3367 N. Downer Ave. Milwaukee, WI (Eschweiler, Alexander C.,Sr.), NRHP-listed
Harold Hornburg House, 213 Warren Ave. Hartland, WI (Eschweiler & Eschweiler), NRHP-listed
Arthur Manegold House, 1202 S. Layton Blvd, Milwaukee, WI (Eschweiler, Alexander C.), NRHP-listed
Marathon County Fairgrounds, Stewart Ave. Wausau, WI (Eschweiler, Alexander C.), NRHP-listed
Marshfield Senior High School, 900 E. Fourth St. Marshfield, WI (Eschweiler & Eschweiler), NRHP-listed
Karl Mathie House, 202 Water St. Mosinee, WI (Eschweiler, Alexander C.), NRHP-listed
Milwaukee County School of Agriculture and Domestic Economy Historic District, 9722 Watertown Plank Rd. Wauwatosa, WI (Eschweiler, Alexander C.), NRHP-listed
Painesdale, Area encompassing Painesdale streets and the Champion Mine Painesdale, MI (Eschweiler, A.C.), NRHP-listed
Pittsburgh Plate Glass Enamel Plant, 201 E. Pittsburgh Ave. Milwaukee, WI (Eschweiler & Eschweiler), NRHP-listed
Rogers Memorial Hospital, 34700 Valley Road, Oconomowoc, WI
Spencerian Business College, 2800 W Wright St. Milwaukee, WI (Eschweiler, Alexander; Eschweiler & Edschweiler), NRHP-listed
Wadhams Gas Station, 1647 S. 76th St. West Allis, WI (Eschweiler, Alexander C.), NRHP-listed
Wawbeek-Horace A.J. Upham House, WI 13 Wisconsin Dells, WI (Eschweiler, Alexander C.), NRHP-listed
C. H. Wegner House, 906 Grant St. Wausau, WI (Eschweiler, Alexander C.), NRHP-listed

Notes

External links
Wisconsin Architectural Archive The archive, located at the Milwaukee Public Library contains many Eschweiler drawings as well as those of other Wisconsin architects.

19th-century American architects
1865 births
1940 deaths
Place of death missing
Architects from Boston
Architects from Milwaukee
Marquette University alumni
Cornell University College of Architecture, Art, and Planning alumni
20th-century American architects
Burials in Wisconsin
People from Chenequa, Wisconsin